Scorpion is the second studio album by American rapper Eve. It was released by Ruff Ryders Entertainment and Interscope Records on March 6, 2001, in the United States. The album's title is a reference to Eve's zodiac sign, Scorpio. It features the hit single "Let Me Blow Ya Mind", a duet with Gwen Stefani, which won the first Grammy Award for Best Rap/Sung Collaboration, a new category at the time.

Scorpion was a critical and commercial success, debuting at number four on the US Billboard 200 with first-week sales of 162,000 copies and became her second consecutive number-one album on the Top R&B/Hip-Hop Albums chart. Scorpion was later certified Platinum by the Recording Industry Association of America (RIAA) on May 10, 2001, for shipments of one million copies. Scorpion was also nominated for Best Rap Album at the 44th Grammy Awards in 2002. As of 2007, it sold 1,500,000 units in the US.

Reception

David Browne of Entertainment Weekly gave the album an A, stating, "More than just a dramatic improvement over its predecessor, Scorpion is the first female hip hop project that even attempts to fill the void left by The Miseducation of Lauryn Hill." AllMusic editor Jason Birchmeier found that on the album "Eve brings even more muscle to her follow-up album, Scorpion. Her rhymes flow just as smoothly here as they did on her debut, and she sounds even more confident than before [...] At 16 tracks, this album doesn't overreach and really doesn't have too many surprises. There are a few flawed moments where the choruses aren't as catchy as they intend to be, but for the most part Eve plays it safe. If you liked her first album, you'll like this one even better."

Track listing

Samples credits
"You Had Me, You Lost Me" contains a portion of the composition "Over Like a Fat Rat" as written by James Calloway, Aaron Davenport, and Leroy Jackson.
"No, No, No" features samples from the Dawn Penn recording "You Don't Love Me (No, No, No)".

Charts

Weekly charts

Year-end charts

Certifications

References

External links
 

2001 albums
Eve (rapper) albums
Ruff Ryders Entertainment albums
Interscope Records albums
Interscope Geffen A&M Records albums
Albums produced by Dr. Dre
Albums produced by Scott Storch
Albums produced by Swizz Beatz
Albums produced by Dame Grease